The Ray Nitschke Memorial Bridge is a twin-leaf bascule bridge over the Fox River on Main Street (US 141) in Green Bay, Wisconsin. It is named in honor of the former Green Bay Packer linebacker Ray Nitschke.

History
The bridge was designed by Parsons Brinckerhoff in 1995. It was built in 1998 replacing the old Main Street Bridge that was built in 1923. In September 2012, the bridge was closed for repairs because of rust problems. The bridge was reopened in November 2012.

See also

References

Road bridges in Wisconsin
Transportation in Green Bay, Wisconsin
Buildings and structures in Green Bay, Wisconsin
Bascule bridges in the United States
Bridges of the United States Numbered Highway System